The 2006 Grand Prix of Cleveland was the sixth round of the 2006 Bridgestone Presents the Champ Car World Series Powered by Ford season, held on June 25, 2006 at Burke Lakefront Airport in Cleveland, Ohio.  It was the 25th anniversary edition of the event.  A. J. Allmendinger took the pole and the win, his second consecutive victory.

Qualifying results

Race

Caution flags

Notes

 New Track Record A. J. Allmendinger 56.283 (Qualification Session #2)
 New Race Lap Record Nelson Philippe 57.508
 New Race Record A. J. Allmendinger 2:00:22.619
 Average Speed 99.722 mph

Championship standings after the race

Drivers' Championship standings

 Note: Only the top five positions are included.

References

External links
 Friday Qualifying Results 
 Saturday Qualifying Results 
 Race Results

Cleveland
Cleveland Grand Prix
Grand Prix of Cleveland